= Therma (Lesbos) =

Coordinates: 39°10′36″N 26°30′13″E

Therma (Ancient Greek: Θέρμα) was a town of ancient Lesbos.

The site of Therma is tentatively located near modern Agios Thumianos.
